Al-Kabir Polytechnic is one of the first private technical institute of Jharkhand, India established on 1990 (then Bihar). It is recognised by Jharkhand University of Technology, Jharkhand and Approved by AICTE Government of India. The institute is run by Kabir Welfare Trust. It offers three years diploma engineering in various branches, such as Diploma in Mechanical Engineering, Diploma in Electrical Engineering, Diploma in Civil Engineering, Diploma in Automobile Engineering, Diploma in Electronics & Communication Engineering, Diploma in Computer Science Engineering.

Branches
The Institute conducts three years Diploma Engineering in the following branches:

Education in Jamshedpur
Technical universities and colleges in India